László Nemes (born Nemes Jeles László; ; 18 February 1977) is a Hungarian film director and screenwriter. His 2015 debut feature film, Son of Saul, was screened in the main competition at the 2015 Cannes Film Festival, where it won the Grand Prix. He is the first Hungarian director whose film has won a Golden Globe for Best Foreign Language Film. Son of Saul is the second Hungarian film to win the Academy Award for Best Foreign Language Film. In 2016, Nemes was a member of the main competition jury of the 2016 Cannes Film Festival.

Early life
Nemes was born in Budapest as the son of a Jewish mother and the Hungarian film and theatre director András Jeles. He moved to Paris at the age of 12. Nemes became interested in filmmaking at an early age and began filming amateur horror films in the basement of his Paris home. After studying History, International Relations and Screenwriting, he started working as an assistant director in France and Hungary on short and feature films. For two years, he worked as Béla Tarr's assistant during the filming of The Man from London.

Career 
After directing his first 35-mm short film, With a Little Patience, in September 2006, he moved to New York to study film directing at New York University's Tisch School of the Arts. Beginning in September 2011, he spent five months in Sciences Po Paris as part of a scholarship program arranged by the Cinéfondation, where he and Clara Royer developed the script for Son of Saul.

In 2012, they continued intensive work on the screenplay for seven months at the Jerusalem International Film Lab rubbing shoulders with emerging directors such as Boo Junfeng and :fr:Morgan Simon.

He developed his project Sunset through the TorinoFilmLab Script&Pitch programme in 2012 and the Framework programme in 2015.

Son of Saul 

His debut feature film, Son of Saul, premiered at the 68th Cannes Film Festival as part of the main competition. It won the Grand Prix, the second-most prestigious prize of the festival. Nemes accepted the 2015 Golden Globe for Best Foreign Language Film for Son of Saul at the telecast on 10 January 2016. It is the third Hungarian film nominated for a Golden Globe and the first Hungarian film to win.

Influences and artistry 
Nemes has named Michelangelo Antonioni, Andrei Tarkovsky, Ingmar Bergman, Terrence Malick and Stanley Kubrick as some of his favorite directors.

Filmography

Feature films
 Son of Saul (2015)
 Sunset (2018)

Short films
 With a Little Patience (2007) (14 minutes, 35mm)
 The Counterpart (2008) (14 minutes, 35mm)
 The Gentleman Takes His Leave (2010) (29 minutes, 35mm)

Awards
 Kossuth Prize (2016)

Feature films
 2015 - Cannes Film Festival - Grand Prix
 2015 - Cannes Film Festival - FIPRESCI Competition Award
 2015 - Cannes Film Festival - François Chalais Prize
 2015 - Golden Globe for Best Foreign Language Film
 2016 - Independent Spirit Award for Best International Film 
 2016 - Academy Award for Best Foreign Language Film
 2017 - BAFTA Award for Best Film Not in the English Language
 2018 - 75th Venice International Film Festival - FIPRESCI Award
 2018 - 15th Seville Film Festival - Eurimages Award To The Best European Coproduction
 2019 - 9th Beijing International Film Festival - The Best Director

Short films
 2007 - Hungarian Society of Cinematographers - Best Short Film
 2007 - Hungarian Film Week - Best Short Film
 2007 - Bilbao International Festival of Documentary and Short Films - Silver Mikeldi
 2008 - Angers Premiers Plans - Best European Short Film
 2008 - Angers Premiers Plans - ARTE Prize
 2008 - Angers Premiers Plans - Best Actress: Virág Marjai
 2008 - Athens International Film & Video Festival - Black Bear Award
 2008 - Mediawave International Film Festival - Best Cinematography
 2008 - Indie Lisboa International Film Festival - Onda Curta Award
 2010 - NexT International Film Festival Bucharest - "Cristian Nemescu" Best Directing Award

References

External links

 

Living people
1977 births
Writers from Budapest
Writers from Paris
Hungarian film directors
Hungarian screenwriters
Hungarian people of Jewish descent
Tisch School of the Arts alumni
Directors of Best Foreign Language Film Academy Award winners
Filmmakers who won the Best Foreign Language Film BAFTA Award